Joseph is an English and French surname. Notable people with this name include:

Aaron Joseph (born 1989), Australian footballer
Alison Joseph, English crime writer
Alzarri Joseph (born 1996), Antiguan cricketer
Amber Joseph (born 1999), Barbadian cyclist
Betty Joseph (1917–2013), British psychoanalyst
Bradley Joseph (born 1965), American composer, pianist, recording artist
Carlos Joseph (1980–2021), American football player
Collinda Joseph (born 1965), Canadian wheelchair curler
Cory Joseph (born 1991), Canadian basketball player
Charles Joseph (disambiguation), several people
Chris Joseph (disambiguation), several people
Claudette Joseph, Grenadian politician
Curtis Joseph (born 1967), Canadian ice hockey player
Daniel D. Joseph (1929–2011), American mechanical engineer
Dave Joseph (born 1969), Antiguan cricketer
Derek Joseph, Pakistani general
Deborah Joseph, American computer scientist
Elinor Joseph (born 1991), Israeli soldier
Ezechiel Joseph, Saint Lucian politician
Francis Joseph (disambiguation), several people
Garth Joseph (born 1973), Dominican basketball player
George Joseph (disambiguation), several people
Geri M. Joseph (born 1923), American politician
Greg Joseph (born 1994), American football player
Guy Joseph (born 1957), Saint Lucian politician
Irving J. Joseph (c.1881–1943), New York politician
Jacqueline Nesti Joseph, (born 1932), Haitian artist
Jane Joseph (1894–1929), English composer
Jane Joseph (cricketer), Trinidadian cricketer
Janine Joseph, a Filipino-American poet and author
Jenny Joseph (1932–2018), British poet
John Joseph (disambiguation), several people
Kathie-Ann Joseph, American surgeon at Columbia University
Kareem Joseph (footballer born 1983), footballer from Trinidad and Tobago
Karl Joseph (born 1993), American football player
Keith Joseph (1918–1994), British politician and architect of Thatcherism
Kelvin Joseph (born 1999), American football player
Kerby Joseph (born 2000), American football player
Kris Joseph (born 1988), Canadian basketball player
Lawrence Albert Joseph, Grenadian attorney and politician
Lesley Joseph (born 1946), British actress
Lazarus Joseph (1891–1966), American NY State Senator and New York City Comptroller
Linval Joseph (born 1988), American football player
MaChelle Joseph (born 1970), American women's basketball coach
Marc Joseph (born 1976), English footballer
Marie Joseph Demers (1871–1940), Canadian politician
Mathai Joseph, Indian computer scientist
Mathieu Joseph (born 1997), Canadian ice hockey player
Miles Joseph (born 1974), American soccer player
Mookencheril Cherian Joseph (1887–1981), Indian rationalist
Nafisa Joseph (1978–2004), Indian model and MTV video jockey
Peterson Joseph (born 1990), Haitian footballer
Philippe Lincourt-Joseph (born 1994), Canadian soccer player
Pierre-Olivier Joseph (born 1999), Canadian ice hockey player
Ronald Joseph (born 1944), American figure skater
Roy Joseph (1909–1979), Trinidad and Tobago politician
Sebastian Joseph (born 1995), American football player
Shalrie Joseph (born 1978), Grenadian footballer
Surelee Joseph (born 1986), Indian television actress and model
Sylvester Joseph (born 1978), Antiguan cricketer
Tam Joseph (born 1947), British painter originally from Dominica
Tyler Joseph (born 1988), American musician and lead singer of Twenty One Pilots
Vivian Joseph (born 1948), American figure skater
Vosean Joseph (born 1997), American football player
Waldren Joseph (1918–2004), American jazz trombone player
Will Joseph (rugby union, born 1877), (1877–1959) Welsh rugby union player
William Joseph (disambiguation), several people
Yvon Joseph (born 1957), Haitian basketball player

See also
 Joseph (disambiguation)
 Joseph (given name), information about the name itself

English-language surnames